Thiotricha syncentritis is a moth of the family Gelechiidae. It was described by Edward Meyrick in 1935. It is found on Java in Indonesia.

The larvae feed in the shoots of Terminalia javanica.

References

Moths described in 1935
Thiotricha
Taxa named by Edward Meyrick